Muhammad Rifky Suryawan (born 7 June 1995) is an Indonesian professional footballer who plays as a left-back or left-winger for Liga 1 club PSS Sleman.

Club career

Martapura FC
Rifky signed with Martapura to play in the Indonesian Liga 2 for the 2020 season. This season was suspended on 27 March 2020 due to the COVID-19 pandemic. The season was abandoned and was declared void on 20 January 2021.

Barito Putera
He was signed for Barito Putera to play in Liga 1 in the 2021 season. Rifky made his league debut on 4 September 2021 in a match against Persib Bandung at the Indomilk Arena, Tangerang.

PSS Sleman
Suryawan was signed for PSS Sleman to play in Liga 1 in the 2022–23 season. He made his league debut on 23 July 2022 in a match against PSM Makassar at the Maguwoharjo Stadium, Sleman.

Career statistics

Club

Notes

References

External links
 Rifky Suryawan at Soccerway
 Rifky Suryawan at Liga Indonesia

1995 births
Living people
People from Yogyakarta
Indonesian footballers
Liga 2 (Indonesia) players
Liga 1 (Indonesia) players
PSIM Yogyakarta players
BaBel United F.C. players
Muba Babel United F.C. players
Dewa United F.C. players
PS Barito Putera players
PSS Sleman players
Association football defenders
Sportspeople from Special Region of Yogyakarta